Jabez is a man appearing in the Book of Chronicles.  He is implied to be ancestor of the Kings of Judah, although not explicitly included in the lineage.  Jabez's birth is difficult; for this reason, his mother names him Jabez (Hebrew יַעְבֵּץ ), meaning "he makes sorrowful".  Jabez's most important action is to conquer new territory with divine sanction. 

Although the textual description of Jabez is brief, some Targumim elaborate that Jabez also established a religious institution for the Levite children of Zipporah: "And he was called Jabez, because in his council he instituted a school of 31 disciples; they were called Tirathim, because in their hymns their voice was like trumpets; and Shimaathim, because in hearing they lifted up their faces, i.e., in prayer; and Suchathim, because they were overshadowed by the Spirit of prophecy."

In Arabic and Persian, Jabez is transliterated as Yabis or Yabiz ( يَعْبِيصَ ).  However, Syriac and Arabic translations use a substantially different transliteration of ainei or "aina", cognate with Hebrew עיני . 

See also
The Prayer of Jabez, a book by Bruce Wilkinson encouraging Christians to take inspiration from Jabez's life.

References 

Books of Chronicles people